Orbital elements are the parameters required to uniquely identify a specific orbit. In celestial mechanics these elements are  considered in two-body systems using a Kepler orbit. There are many different ways to mathematically describe the same orbit, but certain schemes, each consisting of a set of six parameters, are commonly used in astronomy and orbital mechanics.

A real orbit and its elements change over time due to gravitational perturbations by other objects and the effects of general relativity. A Kepler orbit is an idealized, mathematical approximation of the orbit at a particular time.

Keplerian elements 

The traditional orbital elements are the six Keplerian elements, after Johannes Kepler and his laws of planetary motion.

When viewed from an inertial frame, two orbiting bodies trace out distinct trajectories. Each of these trajectories has its focus at the common center of mass. When viewed from a non-inertial frame centered on one of the bodies, only the trajectory of the opposite body is apparent; Keplerian elements describe these non-inertial trajectories. An orbit has two sets of Keplerian elements depending on which body is used as the point of reference. The reference body (usually the most massive) is called the primary, the other body is called the secondary. The primary does not necessarily possess more mass than the secondary, and even when the bodies are of equal mass, the orbital elements depend on the choice of the primary.

Two elements define the shape and size of the ellipse:
Eccentricity—shape of the ellipse, describing how much it is elongated compared to a circle (not marked in diagram).
Semimajor axis — the sum of the periapsis and apoapsis distances divided by two. For classic two-body orbits, the semimajor axis is the distance between the centers of the bodies, not the distance of the bodies from the center of mass.

Two elements define the orientation of the orbital plane in which the ellipse is embedded:
Inclination — vertical tilt of the ellipse with respect to the reference plane, measured at the ascending node (where the orbit passes upward through the reference plane, the green angle  in the diagram). Tilt angle is measured perpendicular to line of intersection between orbital plane and reference plane. Any three points on an ellipse will define the ellipse orbital plane. The plane and the ellipse are both two-dimensional objects defined in three-dimensional space.
Longitude of the ascending node — horizontally orients the ascending node of the ellipse (where the orbit passes from south to north through the reference plane, symbolized by ) with respect to the reference frame's vernal point (symbolized by ♈︎). This is measured in the reference plane, and is shown as the green angle  in the diagram.

The remaining two elements are as follows:
Argument of periapsis defines the orientation of the ellipse in the orbital plane, as an angle measured from the ascending node to the periapsis (the closest point the satellite object comes to the primary object around which it orbits, the blue angle  in the diagram).
True anomaly (or ) at epoch defines the position of the orbiting body along the ellipse at a specific time (the "epoch").

The mean anomaly  is a mathematically convenient fictitious "angle" which varies linearly with time, but which does not correspond to a real geometric angle. It can be converted into the true anomaly , which does represent the real geometric angle in the plane of the ellipse, between periapsis (closest approach to the central body) and the position of the orbiting object at any given time. Thus, the true anomaly is shown as the red angle  in the diagram, and the mean anomaly is not shown.

The angles of inclination, longitude of the ascending node, and argument of periapsis can also be described as the Euler angles defining the orientation of the orbit relative to the reference coordinate system.

Note that non-elliptic trajectories also exist, but are not closed, and are thus not orbits. If the eccentricity is greater than one, the trajectory is a hyperbola. If the eccentricity is equal to one and the angular momentum is zero, the trajectory is radial. If the eccentricity is one and there is angular momentum, the trajectory is a parabola.

Required parameters
Given an inertial frame of reference and an arbitrary epoch (a specified point in time), exactly six parameters are necessary to unambiguously define an arbitrary and unperturbed orbit.

This is because the problem contains six degrees of freedom. These correspond to the three spatial dimensions which define position (in a Cartesian coordinate system), plus the velocity in each of these dimensions. These can be described as orbital state vectors, but this is often an inconvenient way to represent an orbit, which is why Keplerian elements are commonly used instead.

Sometimes the epoch is considered a "seventh" orbital parameter, rather than part of the reference frame.

If the epoch is defined to be at the moment when one of the elements is zero, the number of unspecified elements is reduced to five. (The sixth parameter is still necessary to define the orbit; it is merely numerically set to zero by convention or "moved" into the definition of the epoch with respect to real-world clock time.)

Alternative parametrizations
Keplerian elements can be obtained from orbital state vectors (a three-dimensional vector for the position and another for the velocity) by manual transformations or with computer software.

Other orbital parameters can be computed from the Keplerian elements such as the period, apoapsis, and periapsis. (When orbiting the Earth, the last two terms are known as the apogee and perigee.) It is common to specify the period instead of the semi-major axis in Keplerian element sets, as each can be computed from the other provided the standard gravitational parameter, is given for the central body.

Instead of the mean anomaly at epoch, the mean anomaly , mean longitude, true anomaly , or (rarely) the eccentric anomaly might be used.

Using, for example, the "mean anomaly" instead of "mean anomaly at epoch" means that time  must be specified as a seventh orbital element. Sometimes it is assumed that mean anomaly is zero at the epoch (by choosing the appropriate definition of the epoch), leaving only the five other orbital elements to be specified.

Different sets of elements are used for various astronomical bodies. The eccentricity, and either the semi-major axis, or the distance of periapsis, are used to specify the shape and size of an orbit. The longitude of the ascending node, the inclination, and the argument of periapsis, or the longitude of periapsis, specify the orientation of the orbit in its plane. Either the longitude at epoch, the mean anomaly at epoch, or the time of perihelion passage, are used to specify a known point in the orbit. The choices made depend whether the vernal equinox or the node are used as the primary reference. The semi-major axis is known if the mean motion and the gravitational mass are known.

This method of expression will consolidate the mean motion into the polynomial as one of the coefficients.

Mean motion can also be obscured behind citations of the orbital period .

Euler angle transformations

where:
Orbital elements of bodies (planets, comets, asteroids, ...) in the Solar System usually the ecliptic as that plane.

where

The inverse transformation, which computes the 3 coordinates in the I-J-K system given the 3 (or 2) coordinates in the x-y-z system, is represented by the inverse matrix. According to the rules of matrix algebra, the inverse matrix of the product of the 3 rotation matrices is obtained by inverting the order of the three matrices and switching the signs of the three Euler angles.

where  signifies the polar argument that can be computed with the standard function  available in many programming languages.

Orbit prediction
Under ideal conditions of a perfectly spherical central body and zero perturbations, all orbital elements except the mean anomaly are constants. The mean anomaly changes linearly with time, scaled by the mean motion,

Perturbations and elemental variance

Unperturbed, two-body, Newtonian orbits are always conic sections, so the Keplerian elements define an ellipse, parabola, or hyperbola. Real orbits have perturbations, so a given set of Keplerian elements accurately describes an orbit only at the epoch. Evolution of the orbital elements takes place due to the gravitational pull of bodies other than the primary, the nonsphericity of the primary, atmospheric drag, relativistic effects, radiation pressure, electromagnetic forces, and so on.

Keplerian elements can often be used to produce useful predictions at times near the epoch. Alternatively, real trajectories can be modeled as a sequence of Keplerian orbits that osculate ("kiss" or touch) the real trajectory. They can also be described by the so-called planetary equations, differential equations which come in different forms developed by Lagrange, Gauss, Delaunay, Poincaré, or Hill.

Two-line elements

Keplerian elements parameters can be encoded as text in a number of formats. The most common of them is the NASA / NORAD "two-line elements" (TLE) format, originally designed for use with 80 column punched cards, but still in use because it is the most common format, and can be handled easily by all modern data storages as well.

Depending on the application and object orbit, the data derived from TLEs older than 30 days can become unreliable. Orbital positions can be calculated from TLEs through the SGP / SGP4 / SDP4 / SGP8 / SDP8 algorithms.

Example of a two-line element:
1 27651U 03004A   07083.49636287  .00000119  00000-0  30706-4 0  2692
2 27651 039.9951 132.2059 0025931 073.4582 286.9047 14.81909376225249

Delaunay variables
The Delaunay orbital elements were introduced by Charles-Eugène Delaunay during his study of the motion of the Moon. Commonly called Delaunay variables, they are a set of canonical variables, which are action-angle coordinates. The angles are simple sums of some of the Keplerian angles:
 the mean longitude: 
 the longitude of periapsis:  and
 the longitude of the ascending node: 

Delaunay variables are used to simplify perturbative calculations in celestial mechanics, for example while investigating the Kozai–Lidov oscillations in hierarchical triple systems.

See also
Apparent longitude
Asteroid family, asteroids that share similar proper orbital elements
Beta angle
Ephemeris
Geopotential model
Orbital inclination
Orbital state vectors
Proper orbital elements
Osculating orbit

References

External links
 

 

 

 

  – a serious treatment of orbital elements

 

  – also furnishes orbital elements for a large number of solar system objects

 

 

  – access to VEC2TLE software

  – orbital elements of the major planets

Orbits

fr:Orbite#Paramètres orbitaux